Dazgir (also Romanized as Dazgīr and Dezgir; also known as Dazgiri and Dezgar) is a village in Dasht Rural District, Silvaneh District, Urmia County, West Azerbaijan Province, Iran. At the 2006 census, its population was 525, in 92 families.

References 

Populated places in Urmia County